Wallace Gordon Bryant Jr. (born July 14, 1959) is a retired American professional basketball player who played in the National Basketball Association (NBA) and other leagues.  A ,  pound center, born in Torrejón de Ardoz (Madrid, Spain), Bryant attended Emerson High School in Gary, Indiana, before playing at the University of San Francisco.

Professional playing career
Bryant was drafted by the Chicago Bulls in 1982.  After one season with the Bulls, he was traded to the Dallas Mavericks, on September 14, 1984, with whom he spent the prime of his career.

On November 26, 1986, after two seasons with Dallas, Bryant was waived, and was than picked up by the Los Angeles Clippers. After playing eight games for Los Angeles, he retired from the league in 1986. After playing only three seasons, his entire career totals were 323 points, 374 rebounds, and 40 blocks.

He also played in Spain for FC Barcelona (1986–87), in Italy for Ford Cantù (1982–1983) winning the Euroleague title, Yoga Bologna (1987–1988, Serie A2), and Filodoro Napoli (1990–1991).

Coaching career
In 2011, Bryant became the basketball coach for the California Sea Kings of the new American Basketball Association. Now in 2013–present he Coaches Qwa-zak at private barn(Stockton, CA).

References

External links

Career info
Bio on Mavswiki

1959 births
Living people
American expatriate basketball people in Argentina
American expatriate basketball people in Italy
American expatriate basketball people in Spain
American men's basketball players
Atenas basketball players
Basket Napoli players
Basketball coaches from Indiana
Basketball players from Indiana
CB Girona players
CB Peñas Huesca players
Centers (basketball)
Chicago Bulls draft picks
Chicago Bulls players
Dallas Mavericks players
FC Barcelona Bàsquet players
Ferro Carril Oeste basketball players
Fortitudo Pallacanestro Bologna players
Liga ACB players
Los Angeles Clippers players
National Basketball Association players from Spain
Pallacanestro Cantù players
Parade High School All-Americans (boys' basketball)
Peñarol de Mar del Plata basketball players
San Francisco Dons men's basketball players
Spanish basketball coaches
Spanish people of American descent
Basketball players from Madrid
United States Basketball League coaches